The following list of Arkansas state agencies includes the various Arkansas government branches and divisions.

Executive offices
Arkansas Attorney General
Arkansas Commissioner of State Lands
Arkansas State Auditor
Arkansas State Treasurer
Office of the Governor
Office of Lieutenant Governor
Secretary of State of Arkansas

Legislative
Arkansas Legislature
Arkansas House of Representatives
Arkansas Senate

Judicial
Arkansas Judiciary
Arkansas Supreme Court
Arkansas Court of Appeals
Arkansas Administrative Office of the Courts

Cabinet departments

Following reorganization in 2019, Arkansas state government's executive branch contains fifteen cabinet-level departments. Many formerly independent departments were consolidated as "divisions" under newly created departments under a shared services model. Licensing boards, advisory boards, and commissions dealing with topics under the departments' purview are listed under each department. The governor appoints members to these boards and commissions, and the boards work with the departments to achieve their function. Departments are responsible for maintaining documentation, hosting meetings, and providing staff resources as needed for boards and commissions listed as under their purview. Where specific boards or commissions direct individual divisions or offices, they are listed immediately below.

Department of Agriculture
Arkansas Forestry Division
Arkansas Livestock and Poultry Commission
Arkansas State Plant Board
Aquaculture Division
State Land Surveyor

Department of Commerce
Division of Aeronautics
Arkansas Aeronautics Commission
Arkansas Aviation and Aerospace Commission
Division of Insurance
Arkansas Earthquake Authority Board
Arkansas Governmental Bonding Board
Rural Risk Underwriting Association
State Board of Embalmers, Funeral Directors, Cemeteries and Burial Services
Division of Securities
Division of Services for the Blind
Division of Services for the Blind Board
Division of State Bank
Division of Workforce Services
Arkansas Appeal Tribunal
Arkansas Board of Review
Arkansas Deaf and Hearing Impaired Telecommunications Services Board
Arkansas Workforce Development Board
Office of Skills Development
Career Education and Workforce Development Board
Rehabilitation Services
Alternative Financing Program Board (officially the Technology Equipment Revolving Loan Fund Committee)
Governor's Commission on People with Disabilities
Increasing Capabilities Access Network Advisory Council
State Rehabilitation Council
Telecommunications Access Advisory Council

Other boards and commissions
Arkansas Burial Association Board
Arkansas Development Finance Authority
Arkansas Development Finance Authority Board
Arkansas Economic Development Commission
Arkansas Economic Development Council
Governor's Military Affairs Committee
Minority and Women-Owned Business Advisory Council
Science and Technology Board
Arkansas Rural Development Commission
Arkansas Science and Technology Authority
Arkansas Housing Trust Fund
Arkansas State Banking Board
Arkansas Waterways Commission
Arkansas Wine Producers Council
Economic Development of Arkansas Fund Commission

Department of Corrections
Criminal Detention Facilities Review Coordinator
Criminal Detention Facility Review Committee
Division of Correction
Division of Community Correction
Arkansas State Council for the Interstate Commission for Adult Offender Supervision
Arkansas Corrections School System

Other boards and commissions
Arkansas Board of Corrections
Arkansas Parole Board
Arkansas Sentencing Commission

Department of Education
Arkansas State Board of Education
Division of Career and Technical Education
Division of Elementary and Secondary Education
Division of Higher Education
Arkansas School for the Blind and Visually Impaired
Arkansas School for the Deaf
Arkansas State Library
Arkansas State Library Board
Northwest Technical Institute
Northwest Technical Institute Board of Directors

Other boards and commissions
Veterans Employment & Training Services
Arkansas Higher Education Coordinating Board
Arkansas Workforce Development Board

Department of Energy & Environment
Division of Environmental Quality
Office of Air Quality
Office of Energy
Arkansas Liquefied Petroleum Gas Board
Arkansas Oil and Gas Commission
Office of Land Resources
Office of Water Quality
Arkansas Pollution Control and Ecology Commission

Advisory boards and commissions
Advisory Committee on Petroleum Storage Tanks
Arkansas Geological Survey
Arkansas Marketing Board for Recyclables
Nutrient Water Quality Trading Advisory Panel
Solid Waste Licensing Committee
Wastewater Licensing Committee

Department of Finance and Administration
Division of Alcoholic Beverage Control
Division of Assessment Coordination
Office of Accounting
Reconciliation Section
Appropriations and Funds Section
Comprehensive Annual Financial Report Section
Office of Administrative Services
Office of Budget
Office of Child Support Enforcement
Office of Driver Services
CDL Help Desk
Driver Control Section
Driver Records Section
Safety Responsibility Section
Office of Excise Tax Administration
Miscellaneous Tax Section
Motor Fuel Tax Section
Sales and Use Tax Section
Tax Credits/Special Refunds Section
Office of Field Audit Administration
Electronic Games of Skill Section
Office of Income Tax Administration
Corporation Income Tax Section
Withholding Tax Branch
Office of the Commissioner of Revenue Operations & Administration
Office of the Secretary
Office of State Revenue Administration

Boards and commissions
Board of Finance
State Commission of Child Support
Arkansas Lottery Commission
Arkansas Tobacco Control Board
Governor's Developmental Disabilities Council
Arkansas Medical Marijuana Commission
Arkansas Racing Commission

Department of Health
Arkansas Surgeon General
Universal Newborn Hearing Screening Tracking and Intervention Program
Boards and commissions
Arkansas Heating, Ventilation, Air Conditioning and Refrigeration Licensing Board
Arkansas Health Services Permit Agency
Arkansas Kidney Disease Commission
Arkansas State Board of Health
Arkansas Board of Hearing Instrument Dispensers
Arkansas Board of Examiners in Speech-Language Pathology & Audiology
Arkansas Social Work Licensing Board
Arkansas State Board of Registered Professional Sanitarians
Arkansas State Board of Optometry
Arkansas State Board of Dental Examiners
Arkansas Board of Dispensing Opticians
Arkansas Dietetics Licensing Board
Arkansas State Board of Chiropractic Examiners
Arkansas Board of Examiners in Counseling
Emergency Medical Services Advisory Council
Arkansas State Board of Cosmetology
Arkansas Board of Podiatric Medicine
Arkansas State Board of Physical Therapy
Arkansas State Board of Pharmacy
Arkansas Psychology Board
Arkansas Minority Health Commission
Arkansas State Board of Nursing
Arkansas State Medical Board
Health Services Commission
Grade A Milk Program Advisory Committee xx
Arkansas Spinal Cord Commission
State Examining Committee for Physical Therapists
Breast Cancer Control Advisory Board
Arkansas State Board of Acupuncture and Related Techniques
Marine Sanitation Advisory Committee
Medical Ionizing Radiation Licensure Committee
Alcoholism and Drug Abuse Counselors, Arkansas Board of Examiners
Prescription Drug Advisory Committee
Arkansas Tobacco Settlement Commission
Arkansas Youth Suicide Prevention Task Force
Arkansas Orthotics Prosthetics and Pedorthics Advisory Board
Prescriptive Authority Advisory Commission
Tobacco Prevention and Cessation Advisory Committee
Health Services Permit Commission
Cosmetology Technical Advisory Committee
Advisory Board of Interpreters
Arkansas Suicide Prevention Council
Massage Therapy Technical Advisory Committee

Department of Human Services
Division of Aging, Adult, & Behavioral Health Services
Division of Child Care & Early Childhood Education
Division of Children & Family Services
Division of County Operations
Division of Developmental Disabilities Services
Division of Medical Services
Division of Provider Services & Quality Assurance
Division of Youth Services
Shared Services
Office of Chief Counsel
Office of Communications and Community Engagement
Office of the Secretary

Boards and Commissions
Arkansas Behavioral Health Planning and Advisory Council
Arkansas Governor's Development Disabilities Council
Arkansas Early Childhood Commission
Governor's Advisory Council on Aging
Arkansas Alcohol and Drug Abuse Coordinating Council
Arkansas Drug Director
Arkansas State Epidemiological Outcomes Workgroup
Arkansas State Hospital Advisory Council

State Institutional System Board (SIS)
Early Head Start Governance Board
Child Care Appeal Review Panel
Child Welfare Agency Review Board (Placement and Residential Licensing)
Act 1434 Board (“Name Removal Board” or “Child Maltreatment Central Registry Review Team”)
Child Death and Near Fatality Multidisciplinary Review Committee
Citizens Review Panel
Arkansas Community Action Agencies Association
Autism Legislative Task Force
Board of Developmental Disabilities Services
Early Intervention Quality Assurance
Governor's Employment First Task Force
Human Development Center Mortality Review Committee
Interagency Council (ICC) for First Connections/State Interagency Council
Parent Advisory Council
Drug Cost Committee (DCC)
Drug Review Committee (DRC)
Drug Utilization Review Board (DUR)
Patient-Centered Medical Home (PCMH) Committee
Rate Appeal and Cost Settlement Committee (RACS)
Retrospective Drug Utilization Review (RDUR) Board
Security Advisory Committee (SAC)
Strategic Advisory Group (SAG)
Arkansas Lifespan Respite Coalition
Arkansas Coalition for Juvenile Justice Board
State Institutional System Board (SIS)
Youth Justice Reform Board
Commission on Children, Youth, and Families

Department of Inspector General
Arkansas Fair Housing Commission
Office of Internal Audit
Medicaid Inspector General
Department of Labor and Licensing
Department of the Military

Department of Parks, Heritage, and Tourism
Division of Arkansas Tourism
Division of Arkansas State Parks
Division of Arkansas Heritage
Arkansas Arts Council
Arkansas Historic Preservation Program
Arkansas State Archives
Arkansas Natural Heritage Commission
Delta Cultural Center
Historic Arkansas Museum
Mosaic Templars Cultural Center
Old State House Museum

Department of Public Safety
Arkansas Division of Emergency Management
Arkansas State Police
Arkansas State Police Commission
Arkansas State Crime Laboratory
Arkansas Fire Prevention Commission
Arkansas Crime Information Center
Arkansas Crime Victims Reparations Board

Department of Transformation and Shared Services
Division of Building Authority
Division of Employee Benefits
State and Public School Life and Health Insurance Board
Division of Information Systems
Arkansas State Technology Council
Data and Transparency Panel
Office of Cybersecurity
Division of Land Surveys
Office of GIS
Arkansas GIS Board
Land Survey Advisory Board
Office of Personnel Management
Office of State Procurement

Department of Veteran Affairs
Arkansas Veteran's Commission

Non-cabinet agencies
Arkansas Board of Apportionment
Arkansas Legislative Audit
Arkansas State Highway Commission
Arkansas Department of Transportation
Arkansas Federal Credit Union
Arkansas Public Employees Retirement System
Arkansas Board of Workforce Education and Career Opportunities
Arkansas Department of Career Education
Arkansas Educational Television Commission
Arkansas Game and Fish Commission

Advisory boards and commissions
Arkansas Advisory Council for the Education of Gifted and Talented Children
Arkansas Alternative Energy Commission
Arkansas Beef Council
Arkansas Boll Weevil Eradication Committee
Arkansas Capitol Arts and Grounds Commission
Arkansas Capitol Zoning District Commission
Arkansas Catfish Promotion Board
Arkansas Child Abuse and Neglect Prevention Board
Arkansas Child Abuse, Rape, Domestic Violence Commission
Arkansas Code Revision Commission
Arkansas Corn and Grain Sorghum Board
Arkansas Entertainers Hall of Fame Board
Arkansas Film Commission
Arkansas Judicial Discipline and Disability Commission
Governor's Commission on National Service and Volunteerism - Engage Arkansas
Keep Arkansas Beautiful Commission
Martin Luther King, Jr. Commission

Professional certification, licensure, and registration
Arkansas Abstractor's Board
Arkansas Appraiser Licensing and Certification Board
Arkansas Auctioneers Licensing Board
Arkansas Board of Architects, Landscape Architects and Interior Designers
Arkansas Board of Health Education
Arkansas Board of Interior Designers
Arkansas Board of Certified Court Reporter Examiners
Arkansas Board of Licensure for Professional Engineers and Professional Surveyors
Arkansas Board of Private Investigators and Private Security Agencies
Arkansas Board of Registration for Professional Geologists
Arkansas Commission on Law Enforcement Standards and Training
Arkansas Contractors Licensing Board
Arkansas Elevator Safety Board
Arkansas Fire Protection Licensing Board
Arkansas Home Inspector Registration Board
Arkansas Interest on Lawyers’ Trust Account Foundation Board
Arkansas Professional Bail Bondsman Licensing Board
Arkansas Real Estate Commission
Arkansas Rehabilitation Services
Arkansas State Board of Athletic Training
Arkansas State Board of Barber Examiners
Arkansas State Board of Collection Agencies
Arkansas State Board of Law Examiners
Arkansas State Board of Massage Therapy
Arkansas State Board of Private Career Education
Arkansas State Board of Public Accountancy
Arkansas State Board of Registration for Foresters
Arkansas State Board of Registration for Professional Soil Classifiers
Arkansas Alternative Dispute Resolution Commission
Arkansas Bureau of Legislative Research
Arkansas Cemetery Board
Arkansas Commission on Water Well Construction
Arkansas Ethics Commission
Arkansas History Commission
Arkansas Local Police and Fire Retirement System
Arkansas Manufactured Home Commission
Arkansas Motor Vehicle Commission
Arkansas National Guard Military Department
Arkansas Natural and Cultural Resources Council
Arkansas Natural Resources Commission
Arkansas Office of Health Information Technology
Arkansas Parks, Recreation, and Travel Commission
Arkansas Public Defender Commission
Arkansas Public Service Commission
Arkansas Rice Research and Promotion Board
Arkansas Service Commission
Arkansas Small Business & Technology Development Center
Arkansas Soybean Promotion Board
Arkansas State Athletic Commission
Arkansas State Board of Election Commissioners
Arkansas State Claims Commission
Arkansas State Hospital
Arkansas Student Loan Authority
Arkansas Teacher Retirement System
Arkansas Temporary Assistance for Needy Families Oversight Board
Arkansas Towing and Recovery Board
Arkansas Veterinary Medical Examining Board
Arkansas Wheat Promotion Board
Arkansas Workers’ Compensation Commission
Arkansas Workforce Investment Board
Board of Electrical Examiners of the State of Arkansas
Civil Air Patrol - Arkansas Wing
Disability Determination for Social Security Administration
Governor's Commission on Global Warming
Governor’s Mansion
Historic Arkansas Museum
Information Network of Arkansas
Office of the Prosecutor Coordinator
War Memorial Stadium Commission

References

 
Agencies, departments, and commissions
Arkansas